Razamanaz is the third studio album by the Scottish hard rock band Nazareth, released in May 1973. It was the band's first LP record to break the charts and was produced by Roger Glover of Deep Purple, who the band was on tour with at the time. "Woke Up This Morning" was re-recorded for this album.

Track listing

1996 Castle Communications Bonus Tracks

2001 30th Anniversary Bonus Track

 This remastered CD added three bonus tracks and extensive liner-notes:
 The master tapes for tracks 10 and 11 could not be located and here were 'cleaned up' from vinyl.

2010 Salvo Records Remaster Bonus Tracks

BBC sessions were recorded at Maida Vale Studios for the Bob Harris Show on BBC Radio 1. Producer: Pete Rizkema. Engineer: Bill Aitken. First transmission date: 26 March 1973.

Covers
 "Razamanaz" was covered by US punk band The Meatmen on their 1985 album War of the Superbikes.
 "Razamanaz" was covered by Danish technical thrash metal band Artillery on their 1990 album By Inheritance.
 "Razamanaz" was also recorded by Quiet Riot vocalist Kevin DuBrow, it appears on In for the Kill, a 2004 covers album.
 "Razamanaz" was also recorded by the Supersuckers. It appears on the 1992 compilation album The Songs All Sound the Same, listed as "Razzmanazz".
 "Razamanaz" was covered by Norwegian metal band Artch on their 1991 album For the Sake of Mankind.
 "Razamanaz" was covered by Swedish heavy metal band Morgana Lefay on their 1993 album Knowing Just as I.

Personnel
Nazareth
Dan McCafferty - lead vocals
Darrell Sweet - drums, percussion, backing vocals, liner notes
Pete Agnew - bass guitar, backing vocals
Manny Charlton - electric and acoustic guitars, slide guitar, banjo, backing vocals
Technical
Roger Glover - producer, bass guitar, percussion
Alan Perkins - recording engineer (Pye Mobile Recording Unit)
Geoffrey Emerick - sound engineer (AIR)
Patrick Watters, Fin Costello - photography
Mike Brown - remastering
Robert M. Corich - remastering, liner notes, recovery of bonus tracks
Dave Field - design

Charts

Certifications

References

External links
Lyrics to songs from Razamanaz

Nazareth (band) albums
1973 albums
Albums produced by Roger Glover
A&M Records albums